The 1921–22 season was Port Vale's third consecutive season of football (16th overall) in the English Football League. Another difficult season, both on and off the pitch, the club finished with 36 points for the second season in a row. The club were without a reliable goal scorer following their sale of Bobby Blood the previous season.

The season turned with a streak of nine games unbeaten, which followed a run of nine defeats in ten games. A case of fighting off relegation and just getting by financially, their difficulties were contrasted by the promotion of rivals Stoke – who also knocked the "Valiants" out of the FA Cup just to rub salt into the wound.

Despite such low points the club also experienced brief, but considerable periods of joy. When goalkeeper Teddy Peers turned out for Wales he became the first player to earn an international cap whilst on the books of the club. From 11 February 1922 to 18 March 1922 Peers oversaw a streak of seven consecutive clean sheets in league games, a still standing club record.

Overview

Second Division
New additions to the squad in pre-season included: Welshman Jack Hampson signed from Aston Villa for £1,000; a returning Albert Pearson from Liverpool; half-back Ernest Collinge; centre-half from Nottingham Forest Robert Firth (a future Real Madrid manager); young Scottish midfielder Bob Connelly; and forward Billy Agnew from Falkirk. The stadium was also improved, with a gym constructed, and the new stand extended.

The season started poorly, with Vale losing five of their opening six games – this included a 1–0 home defeat to Stoke in what was the biggest crowd of the season. The side made particularly hard work of finding the net, drawing a blank in five of these games. A 5–2 loss at Bury was reversed into a 5–2 win at home, and the team went on a useful run of eight points from six games. However, from the end of November up until February the club lost nine of their ten league games, as the club stood rooted to the bottom slot. The club turned things around in some style by going two months unbeaten, winning six of their nine games. During this run they went seven games without conceding a goal, with goalkeeper Peers so confident he often felt able to lean casually on his goalpost to watch the Pursell brothers clear up any danger in front of him. The run was broken after injuries set in – including a broken leg for Bob Pursell that necessitated his retirement from the game. Nevertheless, the club continued to pick up enough points to ensure their Second Division survival.

At the end of season, the club were three points clear of the relegation zone, but sixteen points short of rivals Stoke, who were promoted. The team were hopeless in front of goal, managing just a goal a game, yet Rotherham County scored just 32 goals in 42 games and still finished ahead of the "Valiants".

The first team was rather unsettled throughout the campaign thanks to a bureaucratic method of selection. However the Pursell brothers, Billy Briscoe, Tom Page; as well as new signings Ernest Collinge, Bob Connelly, Robert Firth, Jack Hampson, and Billy Agnew were all regular features. The club rotated between three goalkeepers, with a fourth also getting a game. Page was the club's top scorer with a meagre ten goals from all competitions, with Bob Connelly also netting seven. Following an injury to Walter Smith, Teddy Peers was signed from Wolves on an emergency loan. Peers went on to become the first player to be capped whilst at the club when he turned out for Wales.

Finances
Finances were as ever of great concern to the club, and by February the poor crowd figures meant that £2,000 was needed to keep the club afloat. A 'Shilling Fund' was established to raise donations, which resulted in donations from First Division sides Preston North End and Huddersfield Town. A loss of £4,641 was made on the season, with an economic downturn getting the blame for a shocking drop in gate receipt figures. The club even accused local paper The Sentinel of overestimating the crowd sizes. Finances were also hit by a raise in player's wages following the raising of the maximum payments limit. Aiming to make a £500 the following season, the director's announced a cut in the wage bill to the tune of £3,000. This meant letting go of Bob Pursell, who had broken his leg; aged half-back Joe Brough who was said to have felt 'worn out'; 38-year-old stopper Walter Smith; forward Albert Pearson; 35-year-old Robert Firth; and 33-year-old Jack Peart. The former two experienced campaigners simply retired, with Smith joining Plymouth Argyle; Pearson joining Llanelli; Firth joining Southend United; and Peart joining Norwich City.

Cup competitions
Vale left the FA Cup at the First Round thanks to Arthur Watkin scoring a hat-trick, which helped secure a 4–2 win for Stoke at The Old Recreation Ground. The end of season North Staffordshire Infirmary Cup game finished goalless between the two clubs, and as was the case in 1920 the trophy was shared between the two clubs – the cup game was held on-and-off until 1932, and Vale would lose on all five occasions.

League table

Results
Port Vale's score comes first

Football League Second Division

Results by matchday

Matches

FA Cup

North Staffordshire Infirmary Cup

Player statistics

Appearances

Top scorers

Transfers

Transfers in

Transfers out

References
Specific

General

Port Vale F.C. seasons
Port Vale